"Laura" is a song by American pop rock band Scissor Sisters, included as the lead track on their self-titled debut album (2004). The song was released as the band's first single on October 27, 2003, in the United Kingdom, placing at number 54 on the UK Singles Chart. It was later re-issued in June 2004, charting at number 12 on the same chart. In Australia, the song was ranked number 58 on Triple J's Hottest 100 of 2004.

Music video
There are two music videos for the song: "Version 1" and "Version 2". Version 1 was directed by Andy Soup and Version 2 was directed by Alex and Liane.

Track listings

Initial UK release
12-inch picture disc and enhanced CD single 
 "Laura" – 3:35
 "Laura" (City Hi-Fi vocal mix) – 4:24
 "Available (For You)" – 3:40
 "Laura" (video—CD only)

UK re-issue
12-inch single 
A1. "Laura" (original mix) – 3:35
A2. "Laura" (acappella) – 3:35
B1. "Laura" (Paper Faces remix) – 7:49

CD single 
 "Laura" – 3:35
 "Laura" (Craig C's Vocal Dub Workout) – 6:09

European and Australian release
Enhanced maxi-CD single 
 "Laura" – 3:35
 "Borrowed Time" – 4:10
 "Laura" (Riton Re-Rub) – 6:22
 "Laura" (video)

Charts

Certifications

Release history

References

External links
 Official website
 Underground Illusion - The Ultimate Scissor Sisters Database

2003 singles
2003 songs
2004 singles
Polydor Records singles
Scissor Sisters songs
Songs written by Babydaddy
Songs written by Jake Shears
Universal Records singles